The Ostreidae, the true oysters, include most species of molluscs commonly consumed as oysters. Pearl oysters are not true oysters, and belong to the order Pteriida.

Like scallops, true oysters have a central adductor muscle, which means the shell has a characteristic central scar marking its point of attachment. The shell tends to be irregular as a result of attaching to a substrate.

Both oviparous (egg-bearing) and larviparous (larvae-bearing) species are known within Ostreidae. Both types are hermaphrodites. However, the larviparous species show a pattern of alternating sex within each individual, whereas the oviparous species are simultaneous hermaphrodites, producing either female or male gametes according to circumstances.

Members of genus Ostrea generally live continually immersed and are quite flat, with roundish shells. They differ from most bivalves by having shells completely made up of calcite, but with internal muscle scars of aragonitic composition. They fare best in somewhat oligotrophic water. They brood their fertilized eggs for various proportions of the period from fertilization to hatching.

Members of genera Saccostrea, Magallana,  and Crassostrea generally live in the intertidal zone, broadcast sperm and eggs into the sea, and can thrive in eutrophic water. One of the most commonly cultivated oysters is the Pacific oyster, which is ideally suited for cultivation in seawater ponds.

Genera and species

 Alectryonella
 Agerostrea Vialov 1936
 Anomiostrea
 Booneostrea
 Crassostrea Sacco 1897 (27 species)
 Magallana Salvi & Mariottini 2016
 Magallana angulata (Lamarck, 1819)
 M. ariakensis (Fujita, 1913)
 M. belcheri (G. B. Sowerby II, 1871)
 M. bilineata (Röding, 1798)
 M. dactylena (Iredale, 1939)
 M. gigas (Thunberg, 1793)
 M. hongkongensis (Lam & Morton, 2003)
 M. nippona (Seki, 1934)
 M. revularis (Gould, 1861)
 M. sikamea (Amemiya, 1928)
 Cryptostrea Harry 1985 (synonymous with Ostrea
 C. permollis G.B.Sowerby II 1871 - sponge oyster
 Dendostrea Swainson 1835 (12 species)
 D. frons L. 1758 - frond oyster
D. sandvicensis (G.B.Sowerby II )1871 - Hawaiian oyster
 Lopha Röding 1798
 L. cristagalli L. cockscomb oyster
 L. frons L. 1758
 Nanostrea
 Nicaisolopha Vyalov 1936
 Ostrea L. 1758 (approx. 120 species)
 Planostrea
 Pretostrea
 Pustulostrea
 Saccostrea (11 species)
 Striostrea
 S. margariacea Lamarck 1819 - sand oyster
 S. denticulata Born 1778
 S. prismatica Gray 1825
 Teskeyostrea Harry 1985
 T. weberi Olsson 1951 - threaded oyster, Weber oyster

References

 
Taxa named by Constantine Samuel Rafinesque
Bivalve genera